Michał Pulkowski (born 1 January 1979) is a Polish former footballer who played as a midfielder and current manager.

Career

In May 2011, he was released from Ruch Chorzów.

In July 2011, he joined Dolcan Ząbki.

References

External links
 

1979 births
Polish footballers
Legia Warsaw II players
Znicz Pruszków players
Ruch Chorzów players
Ząbkovia Ząbki players
Living people
Footballers from Warsaw
Association football midfielders